Corkickle is a suburb of Whitehaven in Cumbria, England. It is served by Corkickle railway station.

References

Hamlets in Cumbria
Whitehaven